Antsahavaribe may mean either of the two communes in Sava Region, Madagascar:
 Antsahavaribe, Sambava in Sambava District.
 Antsahavaribe, Vohemar in Vohemar District.